JayR Tinaco (born 5 January 1989) is an Australian actor, known for his role as Zayn Petrossian in the Netflix series Another Life and Dr. Xyler in Space Force.

Early life 
Tinaco was born in Manila, Philippines, and grew up in Queensland, Australia.

Early in his career, agents told Tinaco that he needed to do more "straight acting". Tinaco later told Variety "When you’re an actor starting out and you have an agent telling you this, you want to listen because you want to make it and you want to work."

Career 
Tinaco started a career working in the hospitality industry in Sydney. In 2009, he won his first television role performing a trapped student in two episodes of the Australian series Home and Away. Between 2012 and 2015, Tinaco appeared in short films such as Simone Pietro Felice's The Life Again, Samuel Leighton-Dore's Showboy (in which he portrays a drag queen), and The Wake by Leigh Joel Scott. In 2016, he appeared in two episodes of the Australian series Rake.

Tinaco moved to Canada to pursue his acting dreams back in early 2017. In September 2018, Tinaco joined Katee Sackhoff, Tyler Hoechlin, Justin Chatwin, Samuel Anderson and Elizabeth Ludlow in the American series Another Life, broadcast on Netflix. Tinaco plays Zayn Petrossian, the non-binary military doctor aboard the spaceship Salvare. Speaking of Tinaco’s character as "an important role" because the story in the series is not about coming out nor sex (despite several love scenes involving Tinaco’s character and a male crewman). It ran for two seasons from 2019 to 2021. The same year, Tinaco appeared as the restaurant's host in the Netflix film Always Be My Maybe.

Tinaco also appears as Dr. Xyler in the second season of the Netflix series Space Force, which was released in February 2022.

Personal life 
Tinaco is non-binary. Regarding his pronouns, he says,  "I still identify with the pro-nouns He/His/Him in my personal life, but I have friends that call me 'They' or even 'she' and I’m okay with that."

Filmography

Movies 
 2015: Drown by Dean Francis: Dan
 2019: Always Be My Maybe by Nahnachka Khan: Saintly Fare Host
 2021: Swan Song by Benjamin Cleary: Alex

TV shows 
 2009: Home and Away: a trapped student (2 episodes)
 2016: Rake: Qi (2 episodes)
 2019-2021: Another Life: Zayn Petrossian (20 episodes).
2020: A Million Little Things: Stevie (1 episode)
2022: Space Force: Dr Xyler

Short films 
 2012: Your Life Again by Simone Pietro Felice: Alan
 2014: Showboy by Samuel Leighton-Dore: the drag queen

References

External links 
 

Australian television actors
1991 births
Living people
Australian non-binary actors
Australian LGBT actors